The T-Bones were an American, Liberty Records recording group, existing from 1963 to 1966.  The studio recordings of all of their albums but the last were done by American session musicians, The Wrecking Crew.  

They should not be confused with Gary Farr's British mid-1960s band of the same name. In Britain, the name "U.S. T-Bones" was used for the Liberty Records group.

When the T-Bones had a hit in 1966 with the single "No Matter What Shape (Your Stomach's In)", Liberty Records quickly recorded an album of the same name using session musicians from The Wrecking Crew, but those musicians were not willing to go on tour to promote the album.  They were making sufficient money doing sessions in Los Angeles.  So Liberty created a different "public" T-Bones group to appear on record covers, TV, and in concert.  The "public" T-Bones were Judd Hamilton, Dan Hamilton, Joe Frank Carollo, Tommy Reynolds, and Gene Pello.  None of them played on the hit record, nor did they play on the next album, Sippin' and Chippin.  However, the "public" T-Bones did record the T-Bones' final album, Everyone's Gone To The Moon (And Other Trips). Dan Hamilton, Joe Frank Carollo, and Tommy Reynolds later formed the 1970s soft rock trio Hamilton, Joe Frank and Reynolds.

"No Matter What Shape (Your Stomach's In)" was based on the melody from a commercial for Alka-Seltzer. The tune reached No. 3 on the Billboard Hot 100, and its follow-up, "Sippin N Chippin", peaked at No. 62; the accompanying album hit No. 75 on the Billboard 200.

Members, December 26, 1963
Tracks: "Draggin, "Shut Down", "Boss Drag", "Revv' Buggy", "Hey Little Cobra", "Six Banger"
Dave Pell - leader
Steve Douglas - saxophone 
Ervan Coleman - guitar
Tommy Tedesco - guitar
Glen Campbell - guitar
Lyle Ritz - 
M. Ray Pohlman -
Plas Johnson - saxophone
Hal Blaine - drums
Perry Botkin, Jr. - 
Frank Capp -

Members, December 9, 1965
Tracks:  "No Matter What Shape (Your Stomach's In)"; "Chiquita Banana"; "Fever"; "What's In the Bag, Goose"; "Let's Hang On"
Dave Pell, leader
Perry Botkin, Jr., OM, arranger
Tommy Tedesco, guitar
Victor Feldman 
Hal Blaine, drums
Julius Wechter, percussion
Ervan Coleman, guitar
Buddy Clark
Carol Kaye, electric bass guitar 
Lyle Ritz, upright bass
Harold "Lanky" Lindstrot, engineer
Evelyn Roberts,
Martin Berman
Roger Harris, copy
Robert Ross, copy
Joe Saraceno, producer

Members, 1966
 George Dee
Danny Hamilton - Lead guitar
Judd Hamilton - Rhythm guitar
 Gene Pello - Drums
 Richard Torres - Organ

Album: Everyone's Gone To The Moon (And Other Trips)
Joe Frank Carollo — Bass  
Danny Hamilton — Guitar
Judd Hamilton — Guitar
Gene Pello — Drums
Tommy Reynolds — Keyboards / vibraphone / percussion

Albums
Boss Drag (1964) - Liberty LRP-3346/LST-7346
Boss Drag at the Beach (1964) - Liberty LRP-3363/LST-7363
Doin' the Jerk (1965) - Liberty LRP-3404/LST-7404 
No Matter What Shape (Your Stomach's In) (1966) - Liberty LRP-3439/LST-7439
Sippin' and Chippin''' (1966) - Liberty LRP-3446/LST-7446Everyone's Gone To The Moon (And Other Trips) (1966) - Liberty LRP-3471/LST-7471Shapin' Things Up'' (1965) - Sunset SUM-1119/SUS-5119

References

American pop music groups
Liberty Records artists